Lumpen is an American magazine published since 1991, whose editor-in-chief is Edward Marszewski. The magazine covers topics of local and global politics, art and music and is published in Chicago, Illinois, United States. The magazine is often published under themes such as 'makers' or 'comics'.

See also
 WLPN-LP

References

External links
 
Back issues

1991 establishments in Illinois
Music magazines published in the United States
Magazines established in 1991
Magazines published in Chicago